Melvin R. "Chick" Harbert (February 20, 1915 – September 1, 1992) was an American professional golfer.

Harbert won seven times on the PGA Tour, including one major championship, the 1954 PGA Championship, then a match play event. A three-time finalist, he was also that event's runner-up twice, in 1947 (falling to Jim Ferrier) and 1952 (to Jim Turnesa). Harbert was one of the great PGA Championship match play competitors, compiling a 24–10 record between 1946, his first appearance, and 1957, the final year of the match play format.

In 1949, Harbert played on the Ryder Cup team, winning his singles match against Sam King, 4 and 3, at Ganton Golf Club in Scarborough, England. He was playing-captain of the U.S. team in 1955, with a singles victory against Syd Scott (3 and 2) to his credit.

In 1955, he represented the United States at the Canada Cup team competition at Columbia Country Club outside Washington, D.C. He teamed with Ed Furgol, with the duo outdueling Australia's team of Peter Thomson and Kel Nagle by nine strokes. He finished fourth in the individual competition, two strokes out of the Furgol, Thomson and Flory Van Donck playoff that Furgol won.

After turning 50, he made two official Senior PGA Tour appearances. He tied for 43rd at the 1981 Michelob Senior Classic and then tied for 40th in the same tournament the following year. In addition, he played in nine Liberty Mutual Legends of Golf team events, with his top showing a fifth-place performance in the inaugural event in 1978, when he teamed with Bob Toski.

Harbert was born in Dayton, Ohio, and served in the U.S. Army Air Forces during World War II. He died of a cerebral hemorrhage at age 77 at his home in Ocala, Florida.

Amateur wins
this list may be incomplete
1939 Trans-Mississippi Amateur

Professional wins

PGA Tour wins (7)
1941 (1) Beaumont Open-Texas
1942 (2) Texas Open, St. Paul Open
1948 (2) Jacksonville Open, Charlotte Open
1949 (1) Inverness Invitational Four-Ball (with Bob Hamilton)
1954 (1) PGA Championship

Major championship is shown in bold.

Other wins
this list is probably incomplete
1937 Michigan Open (as an amateur)
1942 Michigan Open
1946 Michigan PGA Championship
1947 Michigan PGA Championship
1948 Michigan Open
1949 Michigan PGA Championship
1950 Michigan PGA Championship
1953 Michigan Open, Michigan PGA Championship
1957 Puerto Rico Open
1959 Michigan PGA Championship

Major championships

Wins (1)

Note: The PGA Championship was match play until 1958

Results timeline

Note: Harbert never played in The Open Championship.

LA = low amateur
NT = no tournament
WD = withdrew
CUT = missed the half-way cut (3rd round cut in 1958 PGA Championship)
R128, R64, R32, R16, QF, SF = round in which player lost in PGA Championship match play
"T" indicates a tie for a place

Summary

Most consecutive cuts made – 12 (1951 PGA – 1956 Masters)
Longest streak of top-10s – 3 (1942 Masters – 1946 U.S. Open)

U.S. national team appearances
Professional
Ryder Cup: 1949 (winners), 1955 (winners, playing captain)
Canada Cup: 1955 (winners)
Hopkins Trophy: 1955 (winners)

See also
List of golfers with most PGA Tour wins
List of men's major championships winning golfers

References

External links

American male golfers
PGA Tour golfers
Ryder Cup competitors for the United States
Winners of men's major golf championships
Golfers from Ohio
United States Army Air Forces personnel of World War II
Sportspeople from Dayton, Ohio
Sportspeople from Ocala, Florida
1915 births
1992 deaths